The She-Gallants is a 1695 comedy play by the English writer George Granville. It was first staged by Thomas Betterton's Company at the Lincoln's Inn Fields Theatre in London.

The original cast included Thomas Betterton as Bellamour, John Hodgson as Philabel, John Thurmond as Frederick, Cave Underhill as Sir Toby Cusifle, William Bowen as Sir John Aery, Thomas Doggett as Vaunter, Samuel Bailey as Courtall, Elizabeth Barry as Lady Dorimen, Anne Bracegirdle as  Angelica, Elizabeth Boutell as Constantia, Elizabeth Bowman as Lucinda and Elinor Leigh as Plackett.

References

Bibliography
 Stayn, J.L. Restoration Comedy in Performance. Cambridge University Press, 1986.
 Van Lennep, W. The London Stage, 1660-1800: Volume One, 1660-1700. Southern Illinois University Press, 1960.

1695 plays
West End plays
Plays by George Granville
Restoration comedy
Plays set in London